Eupithecia brevifasciaria is a moth in the  family Geometridae. It is found in China.

References

Moths described in 1897
brevifasciaria
Moths of Asia